was the lead ship in the four-vessel  of heavy cruisers in the Imperial Japanese Navy. She was named after the Mogami River in Tōhoku region of Japan.  The Mogami-class ships were constructed as "light cruisers" (per the London Naval Treaty) with five triple 155 mm dual purpose guns.  They were exceptionally large for light cruisers, and the barbettes for the main battery were designed for quick refitting with twin 8-inch guns. In 1937 all four ships were "converted" to heavy cruisers in this fashion.  Mogami served in numerous combat engagements in World War II, until she was sunk at the Battle of Leyte Gulf in October 1944.

Background and design
Built under the Maru-1 Naval Armaments Supplement Programme, the Mogami-class cruisers were designed to the maximum limits allowed by the Washington Naval Treaty, using the latest technology. This resulted in the choice of the dual purpose (DP) 15.5 cm/60 3rd Year Type naval guns as the main battery in five triple turrets capable of 55° elevation. These were the first Japanese cruisers with triple turrets. Secondary armament included eight 12.7 cm/40 Type 89 naval guns in four twin turrets, and 24 Type 93 Long Lance torpedoes in four rotating triple mounts.

To save weight, electric welding was used, as was aluminum in the superstructure, and a single funnel stack.

The class was designed from the start to be upgraded into heavy cruisers with the replacement of their main battery with 20 cm/50 3rd Year Type naval guns in twin turrets.

Both vessels, and their yet-to-be-completed sisters,  and  underwent a complete and very costly rebuilding program. Once rebuilt, the design, with its very high speed, armor protection, and heavy armament was among the best in the world during World War II.

Service career

Early career

Mogami was laid down on 27 October 1931, launched on 14 March 1934 and completed at Kure Naval Arsenal on 28 July 1935. Her first captain was Captain Tomoshige Samejima, formerly captain of the cruiser , who oversaw her completion and remained captain until November 1935. He was followed by Captain Seiichi Itō, until April 1936. Mogami was commanded by Captain Shunji Isaki from November 1939 to January 1941.

Mogami was damaged in a 1935 typhoon as part of the Fourth Fleet incident. In mid-1941, Mogami participated in the occupation of Cochinchina, French Indochina, from its forward operating base on Hainan after Japan and Vichy French authorities reached an understanding on use of air facilities and harbors from July 1941. At the time of the attack on Pearl Harbor, Mogami was assigned to cover the Japanese invasion of Malaya as part of Cruiser Division 7 under Vice Admiral Jisaburo Ozawa's First Southern Expeditionary Fleet, providing close support for landings of Japanese troops at Singora, Pattani and Kota Bharu.

In December 1941, Mogami was tasked with the invasion of Sarawak, together with Mikuma, covering landings of Japanese troops at Kuching. In February 1942, Mogami was assigned to cover the landings of Japanese troops in Java, Borneo and Sumatra.

The Battle of Sunda Strait

Both Houston and Perth were sunk during the engagement, as was Japanese transport Ryūjō Maru with IJA 16th Army commander Lieutenant General Hitoshi Imamura aboard.

In March, Mogami and Cruiser Division 7 were based out of Singapore to cover Japanese landings on the Bangka Island off of Sumatra and the seizure of the Andaman Islands.

Indian Ocean Raids
From 1 April 1942 Cruiser Division 7 based from Mergui, Burma joined with Cruiser Division 4 to participate in the Indian Ocean raids against Allied shipping. During the operation, the "Southern Group" claimed kills on the 7,726-ton British passenger ship Dardanus, the 5,281-ton British steamship Ganara, and the 6,622-ton British merchant vessel Indora, en route from Calcutta to Mauritius.

On 22 April, Cruiser Division 7 returned to Kure, and Mogami went into dry dock for overhaul. On 26 May, Cruiser Division 7 arrived at Guam to provide close support for Rear Admiral Raizō Tanaka's Midway Invasion Transport Group.

Battle of Midway

On 5 June, Admiral Isoroku Yamamoto, CINC of the Combined Fleet ordered Cruiser Division 7 to shell Midway Island in preparation for a Japanese landing. The sea was choppy and the destroyers lagged behind. At 2120, the order was canceled. However, this dash placed Cruiser Division 7 within torpedo range of the submarine , which was spotted by Kumano, which signaled a 45° simultaneous turn to port to avoid possible torpedoes. The emergency turn was correctly executed by the flagship and Suzuya, but the third ship in the line, Mikuma, erroneously made a 90° turn. Behind her, Mogami turned 45° as commanded. This resulted in a collision in which Mogami rammed Mikumas portside, below the bridge. Mogamis bow caved in and she was badly damaged. At 0534, retiring Mikuma and Mogami were bombed from high altitude by eight USAAF Boeing B-17 Flying Fortresses from Midway, but they scored no hits. At 0805, six USMC Douglas SBD Dauntless dive-bombers and six Vought SB2U Vindicators from Midway attacked Mikuma and Mogami but they only achieved several near-misses.

Mikuma was hit by at least five bombs and set afire. Her torpedoes ignited and the resultant explosions destroyed the ship. Arashio and Asashio were each hit by a bomb. Mogami was hit by six bombs. Her No. 5 turret was destroyed and 81 crewmen were killed. However, Lieutenant Commander Masayushi Saruwatari had jettisoned torpedoes and other explosives, making it easier to save the cruiser when it was hit by a bomb near the torpedo tubes.

Respite in Japan
Mogami rejoined Cruiser Division 7 on 8 June and was repaired at Truk. On 20 June, Rear Admiral Shoji Nishimura assumed command of Cruiser Division 7, and Cruiser Division 7 was transferred to the Third Fleet. Mogami returned to Japan, and underwent a major conversion at Sasebo Naval Arsenal from 25 August to an aircraft cruiser to improve the fleet's reconnaissance capabilities. Her No. 4 turret and the damaged No. 5 turret were removed and her aft magazines modified to serve as gasoline tanks and munitions storage. Her aft deck was extended and fitted with a rail system to accommodate the planned stowage of 11 Aichi E16A Zuiun ("Paul") reconnaissance floatplanes. The dual Type 96 25 mm AT/AA Gun and Type 93 13-mm machine guns were replaced by 10 triple mount Type 96s and a Type 21 air-search radar. As the new E16A aircraft were not yet available, three older Mitsubishi F1M2 Type 0 ("Pete") two-seat biplanes and four Aichi E13A1 Type O ("Jake") three-seat reconnaissance floatplanes were embarked. Rebuilding was completed on 30 April 1943, and Mogami was re-commissioned into the First Fleet. .

On 22 May, Mogami collided with oiler Toa Maru in Tokyo Bay and was damaged slightly. On 8 June, while at Hashirajima, Mogami was moored near the battleship  when the latter exploded and sank. Mogami sent boats to rescue survivors, but they found none.

On 9 July 1943, Mogami departed Japan for Truk, with a major convoy of troops and supplies; the task force was unsuccessfully attacked by the submarine , and after reaching Truk, continued on to Rabaul.

From August through November, Mogami made numerous sorties from its base at Truk in search of the American fleet and in response to American probing attacks into the Marshall Islands. From 3 November, Cruiser Divisions 4, 7 and 8 were assigned to the Solomon Islands front, to attack American forces off Bougainville. While at anchor at Rabaul on 5 November, Mogami was attacked by a SBD Dauntless dive-bomber from the aircraft carrier  and hit by a  bomb. She was set on fire and 19 crewmen were killed.

After repairs at Truk by the repair vessel , Mogami was ordered back to Japan. While at Kure from 22 December eight more Type 96 single-mount 25-mm AA guns were installed on the aft deck, bringing the total to 38 barrels. Refit was completed by 8 March 1944, and Mogami returned to Singapore a week later.

Battle of the Philippine Sea

On 13 June 1944, Admiral Soemu Toyoda, CINC, Combined Fleet, activated the "A-Go" plan for the defense of the Mariana Islands.

At 0530 on 19 June, Mogami launched two reconnaissance floatplanes. Later in the day, the Mobile Fleet's aircraft attacked Task Force 58 off Saipan, but suffered overwhelming losses in the "Great Marianas Turkey Shoot". At 2030 on 20 June, two hours after she was hit by torpedoes by Grumman TBM Avengers  from the aircraft carrier , Hiyō exploded and sank. That night, Mogami retired with the remnants of the Japanese fleet to Okinawa, and from there to Hashirajima.

Back in Kure on 25 June 1944, Mogami was refitted once again.  Four triple-mount and ten single-mount Type 96 25-mm AA guns were installed, bringing the total to 60 barrels (14×3 and 18×1) and a Type 22 surface search radar and Type 13 air-search radar were fitted. On 8 July, Mogami departed Kure via Okinawa and Manila back for Singapore and Brunei, and was involved in fleet training and patrols in the Singapore-Brunei area through October.

Battle of Leyte Gulf

In late October, the Japanese fleet assembled in Brunei in response to the threatened American invasion of the Philippines. In the morning of 24 October 1944, Vice Admiral Nishimura ordered the launch of Mogamis floatplane to reconnoiter Leyte Gulf. The plane reported sighting four battleships, two cruisers and about 80 transports off the landing area and four destroyers and several torpedo boats near Surigao Strait. Mogami was damaged slightly by strafing and rockets.

Battle of Surigao Strait

On 25 October, between 0300-0330, the Japanese force was attacked by American PT boats and destroyers. The destroyer  was sunk, and the destroyer  disabled, but Mogami was not hit. Fusō and Yamashiro both later sank. Between 0350–0402 hours on 25 October, after entering the Surigao Strait, Mogami was struck by four  shells from the heavy cruiser , which destroyed both the bridge and the air defense center. Both the captain and executive officer were killed on the bridge, and the chief gunnery officer assumed command. While attempting to retire southward, the flagship of Admiral Shima, collided with Mogami. Nachis bow was damaged and she began to flood. Mogami was holed starboard above the waterline, but fires ignited five torpedoes that exploded and disabled her starboard engine. At 0830, Mogamis port engine broke down. At 0902, while adrift, she was attacked by 17 TBF Avenger torpedo-bombers from Task Group 77.4.1 and was hit by two 500-lb. bombs.

At 1047, Mogamis crew abandoned ship, and she stayed afloat for the next two hours. At 1240, the destroyer  scuttled her with a single Type 93 "Long Lance" torpedo. Akebono rescued 700 survivors, but 192 crewmen perished with the ship.

Mogami was removed from the Navy List on 20 December 1944.

Wreck

Sources

References

Further reading

External links

 Gallery: US Navy Historical Center

Mogami-class cruisers
Ships built by Kure Naval Arsenal
1934 ships
World War II cruisers of Japan
Shipwrecks in the Surigao Strait
World War II shipwrecks in the Pacific Ocean
Cruisers sunk by aircraft
Maritime incidents in October 1944
Ships sunk by US aircraft
Shipwreck discoveries by Paul Allen
Shipwrecks of the Philippines
2019 archaeological discoveries